Juberg-Hayward syndrome is a rare genetic syndrome characterised by cleft lip and cleft palate, microcephaly, ptosis, short stature, hypoplasia or aplasia of thumbs, dislocation of radial head and fusion of humerus and radius. The abnormalities in the arm lead to restriction of movement in the elbow.

Presentation

These include
 Growth retardation
 Microcephaly
 Cleft lip and palate
 Minor vertebral and rib anomalies
 Horseshoe kidneys
 Thumb anomalies
 Triphalangeal thumb
 Radial ray anomalies

Genetics

This syndrome is caused by mutations in the establishment of cohesion 1 homolog 2 (ESCO2) gene. This gene is located on the short arm of chromosome 8 (8p21.1). Mutations in this gene also cause Roberts/SC phocomelia syndrome.

Juberg-Hayward syndrome  is inherited in both an autosomal recessive and autosomal dominant fashion.

History

This condition was first described in 1969 by Juberg and Hayward.

References

External links 

Syndromes affecting bones
Rare syndromes
Congenital disorders
Rare diseases
Autosomal dominant disorders
Autosomal recessive disorders